Dalakhay is a rural locality (an ulus) in Tunkinsky District, Republic of Buryatia, Russia. The population was 543 as of 2010. There are 12 streets.

Geography 
Dalakhay is located 69 km east of Kyren (the district's administrative centre) by road. Tory is the nearest rural locality.

References 

Rural localities in Tunkinsky District